This is a list of members of the 5th Legislative Assembly of Queensland from 1870 to 1871, as elected at the 1870 colonial elections held between 27 July 1870 and 15 September 1870 (due to problems of distance and communications, it was not possible to hold the elections on a single day).

See also
Premier:
 Arthur Hunter Palmer (1870–1874)

Notes
 On 23 March 1871, Charles Haly, member for Burnett, resigned. John Bramston won the resulting by-election on 3 April 1871.

References

 Waterson, Duncan Bruce: Biographical Register of the Queensland Parliament 1860-1929 (second edition), Sydney 2001.
 Alphabetical Register of Members (Queensland Parliament)
 Brisbane Courier variously over 1871–1873

Members of Queensland parliaments by term
19th-century Australian politicians